Mallon is a surname. An Irish variant is "Ó Mealláin". The name may refer to any of these well-known people:

People
Alice Mallon (1900–1992), Australian soprano
Andy Mallon (born 1983), Irish Gaelic football player
Bill Mallon (born 1952), American historian
Feardorcha Ó Mealláin, Irish poet
George B. Mallon (1865–1928), American journalist
George H. Mallon (1877–1934), American army captain and Medal of Honor recipient
Gui Mallon (born 1953), Brazilian composer
Henry Neil Mallon (1895–1983), American businessman
Henry Ó Mealláin (1579–1642), Irish Franciscan friar
James Joseph Mallon (1874–1961), British political activist
Jean Mallon (1904–1982), French palaeographer
Jim Mallon (born James Joseph Mallon, 1956), American television producer
Mary Mallon (1869–1938), American typhoid carrier
Meg Mallon (born 1963), American golfer
Nichola Mallon (born 1979), Irish politician
Ray Mallon (born 1955), British politician
Ryan Mallon (born 1983), British football player
Seamus Mallon (1936–2020), Irish politician 
Tarlach Ó Mealláin, Irish writer
Thomas Mallon (born 1951), American writer

Other uses
Mallon Building, Indiana
Hail Mary Mallon, an American hip-hop group consisting of Aesop Rock, Rob Sonic, and DJ Big Wiz.

References